Philip Anderson may refer to:

People
 Philip W. Anderson (1923–2020), American physicist and Nobel laureate
 Philip W. Anderson (film editor) (1915–1980), American film editor
 Phil Anderson (cyclist) (born 1958), Australian racing cyclist

Fictional characters
 Philip Anderson (Sherlock), character in British television series

See also
Philip Andersen (born 1980), Danish race car driver
Anderson (surname)